Streptomyces himastatinicus is a bacterium species from the genus of Streptomyces. Streptomyces himastatinicus produces himastatin.

See also 
 List of Streptomyces species

References

Further reading

External links
Type strain of Streptomyces himastatinicus at BacDive -  the Bacterial Diversity Metadatabase

himastatinicus
Bacteria described in 2008